Annie Funke (born April 9, 1985) is an American actress. She starred as FBI Supervisory Special Agent and Medical Examiner Mae Jarvis on the CBS crime drama series Criminal Minds: Beyond Borders.

Early life
Funke was born in Edmond, Oklahoma. She graduated from University of Oklahoma in 2007 and earned her Bachelor of Fine Arts (BFA) in musical theater from the University of Oklahoma. She later graduated from the Steppenwolf Theatre Company in Chicago in 2011.

Career
Funke's career has mostly been on the stage. She was featured in the off-Broadway hit “Punk Rock” and she has starred opposite Jake Gyllenhaal in the Roundabout Theater's If There Is I Haven't Found It Yet. Her additional theater credits include the Broadway production of Hairspray and the San Francisco production of Wicked. Her first professional acting job was at age 16, as Jan in Grease at the Lyric Theatre in Oklahoma City. Funke broke onto the entertainment scene in the critically acclaimed film A Most Violent Year in 2014. On July 17, 2015, it was announced that Funke had been cast in the CBS crime drama series Criminal Minds: Beyond Borders as SSA and Medical Examiner Mae Jarvis.

Filmography

Film

Television

References

External links

1985 births
Living people
Actresses from Oklahoma
People from Edmond, Oklahoma
University of Oklahoma alumni
21st-century American actresses